The 2010 Winter Paralympics, officially known as the X Paralympic Winter Games, were held in Vancouver, British Columbia, Canada, from March 12 to March 21, 2010. A total of 506 athletes from 44 nations participated in 64 events from five different sport disciplines.

Athletes from 21 countries won at least one medal, 15 of them winning at least one gold medal. For the second consecutive Winter Games, Russia won the most medals in total, with 38. Germany collected the most gold medals, with 13. The most individual gold medals were won by Canadian Lauren Woolstencroft, who secured five in alpine skiing, and German Verena Bentele, with two in biathlon and three in cross-country skiing.

Viviane Forest of Canada became the first Paralympian to win a gold medal in both the Winter and Summer Games when she won the women's downhill event for visually impaired athletes. She had previously won gold medals in the 2000 and 2004 Summer Paralympics for women's goalball.


Medal table

The ranking in this table is based on information provided by the International Paralympic Committee (IPC) and is consistent with IPC convention in its published medal tables. By default, the table is ordered by the number of gold medals the athletes from a nation have won (in this context, a nation is an entity represented by a National Paralympic Committee). The number of silver medals is taken into consideration next and then the number of bronze medals. If nations are still tied, equal ranking is given and they are listed alphabetically by IPC country code.

In the men's downhill standing two silver medals were awarded for a second-place tie. No bronze medal was awarded for that event.

See also
2010 Winter Olympics medal table

References

General
 
 
Specific

Medal table
Winter Paralympics medal tables